In 2017, elections were held to elect members of the Parliament of the Republic of North Ossetia–Alania. Vyacheslav Bitarov returned as Head of North Ossetia-Alania.

Results

References 

Elections in North Ossetia
2017 elections in Russia
September 2017 events in Russia
Regional elections in Russia